Gim Seong-ok may refer to:

 Kim Seong-ok (born 1967), South Korean para table tennis player
 Kim Sung-ok (born 1970), South Korean rower
 Kim Song-ok (politician), a North Korean member of the 5th Supreme People's Assembly